Saint John East is a provincial electoral district for the Legislative Assembly of New Brunswick, Canada.

The riding was created in the 1973 redistribution and was called East Saint John.  The riding was created from the two member district of Saint John East, which was divided into this riding and Saint John-Fundy.  Under the 1994 redistribution the riding was largely unchanged, losing some territory to Saint John-Fundy while gaining other small parts from Saint John-Fundy and Saint John Park. It was renamed Saint John Champlain as parts of the City of Saint John known locally as East Saint John had been moved out of the district.  In 2006, the district boundaries were again changed, losing some territory to adjacent districts but taking in all of what is known as East Saint John; as a result, its name was changed to Saint John East.  At the 2013 redistribution, the riding was altered significantly with nearly half of its population moving to the north to join Saint John Portland, being replaced by territory gained from the abolished district of Saint John-Fundy.

Members of the Legislative Assembly

Gary Keating resigned on October 14, 2014, just 22 days after being elected. Keating was never sworn in.

Election results

Saint John East, 2014–present

Saint John East, 2006–2010

Saint John Champlain, 1994–2003

East Saint John

References

External links 
Website of the Legislative Assembly of New Brunswick

New Brunswick provincial electoral districts
Politics of Saint John, New Brunswick